James Phillip McQueen (3 June 1895 – 24 April 1980) was an Australian rules footballer who played with Geelong in the Victorian Football League (VFL).

Notes

External links 

1895 births
1980 deaths
Australian rules footballers from Victoria (Australia)
Geelong Football Club players